Juan Holz (born 21 November 1943) is a Chilean alpine skier. He competed in three events at the 1964 Winter Olympics.

References

1943 births
Living people
Chilean male alpine skiers
Olympic alpine skiers of Chile
Alpine skiers at the 1964 Winter Olympics
Sportspeople from Santiago
20th-century Chilean people